Rapuano is an Italian surname. Notable people with the surname include:

Ed Rapuano (born 1957), American baseball umpire
Kenneth Rapuano, American Marine
Paschoal Rapuano (born 1918), Brazilian rower

Italian-language surnames